Phase 5, Phase V or Phase Five may refer to:

 Marvel Cinematic Universe: Phase Five, an in-development group of superhero films and television series
 Phase5, a hardware manufacturer for the Amiga computer
 Deployment phase 5, a final deployment phase of a U.S. Marine Corps reconnaissance force
 Pandemic phase 5, the second highest level of a pandemic alert
 Phase 5, Mohali, a residential area of Mohali, Punjab